Wan Ahmad Fayhsal bin Wan Ahmad Kamal (born 8 May 1987) is a Malaysian politician who has served as the Member of Parliament (MP) for Machang since November 2022. He served as the Deputy Minister of National Unity in the Barisan Nasional (BN) administration under former Prime Minister Ismail Sabri Yaakob and former Minister Halimah Mohamed Sadique from August 2021 to the collapse of the BN administration in November 2022 and the Deputy Minister of Youth and Sports in the Perikatan Nasional (PN) administration under former Prime Minister Muhyiddin Yassin and former Minister Reezal Merican Naina Merican from March 2020 to the collapse of the PN administration in August 2021 as well as Senator from  March 2020 to his resignation in November 2022. He is a member of the Malaysian United Indigenous Party (BERSATU), a component party of the PN coalition. He has also served as the 2nd Youth Chief of BERSATU since August 2020 and Deputy Youth Chief II of PN. Early in his political career he was known as "Mat Jargon" for his needless and unfounded use of bombastic language. Furthermore, his penchant for using Arabic language and quoting Islamic scripture during his speeches, often with little context and lack of suitability earned him the nickname of "Mat Tabayyun".

Early life and education 
He grew up and received primary schooling in the neighbourhood of Taman Melawati, Kuala Lumpur before moving to Sekolah Menengah Sains Selangor, a science-focused boarding school in nearby Cheras. He obtained his bachelor's degree in chemical engineering from Universiti Teknologi Petronas (UTP).

He also took courses in Islamic theology and metaphysics, philosophy, ethics and history at the International Institute of Islamic Civilisation and Malay World (ISTAC), International Islamic University Malaysia (IIUM) and later at the Raja Zarith Sofiah Centre for Advanced Studies on Islam, Science and Civilisation (CASIS), University of Technology Malaysia. It was at both institutions that he was instructed in and subscribed to the concept of Islamisation of knowledge as espoused by eminent scholar and Islamic philosopher Tan Sri Syed Muhammad Naquib al-Attas. He also further polished his Arabic and French as part of his studies.

He pursued his interest in social sciences by obtaining the London School of Economics' Business, International Relations and Political Economy online course, and later earned his Master of Arts in Geopolitics (Territorial Security) from King's College London on 23 January 2019. His thesis was titled "The Encircling Dragon: Deciphering China's Geo-economic Expansionism in Peninsular Malaysia".

Early career 
Upon graduation, he worked at Malaysia's national oil and gas company PETRONAS as a Business and Strategic Planning Executive under the Technology and Engineering (T&E) Division.

On 1 April 2010, he became Senior Executive of the Bumiputera Agenda Steering Unit (TERAJU), and was one of the individuals responsible for establishing the Bumiputera Education Steering Foundation (PENERAJU) under the Prime Minister's Department.

He served as assistant lecturer at the Selangor International Islamic University College (KUIS) before he becoming Research Fellow at the Putra Business School, Universiti Putra Malaysia. He was also active writing on various issues including business and geopolitics on various publications including New Straits Times, The Star, Global Research, Asia Times and The Edge.

Political career 
He was a Special Tasks Officer to the then Minister of Youth and Sports, Syed Saddiq Syed Abdul Rahman from late 2018 until early 2020. Following the fall of the Pakatan Harapan (PH) government due to 'Sheraton Move', he was appointed Deputy Minister of Youth and Sports under the Cabinet of Muhyiddin Yassin. On the same day, he was made Senator (member of Dewan Negara or Malaysian Senate) to be qualify him for a cabinet post. 

On 16 August 2020, he succeeded Syed Saddiq Syed Abdul Rahman as the head of ARMADA, the youth wing of the Malaysian United Indigenous Party (BERSATU) in the party's first election. Syed Saddiq, a founding member of BERSATU and its inaugural, pro-tem youth chief, was earlier sacked from BERSATU amidst a political crisis. Wan Ahmad Fayhsal was subsequently appointed the Deputy Chief II of Perikatan Nasional's youth wing.

After Muhyiddin Yassin tendered his cabinet's resignation upon losing his parliamentary majority after at least 15 Members of Parliament from UMNO withdrew their support for the ruling coalition, he became the Deputy Minister of National Unity in the Ismail Sabri Administration.

In the 15th Malaysian general election, Wan Ahmad Fayhsal won the parliamentary seat in Machang.

Controversies
During his deputy ministership, he courted controversy with his lack of economic competence when he suggested that the Central Bank of Malaysia should 'hit the printing press' (a reference to direct monetary financing concept under the Modern Monetary Theory, but is often confused with quantitative easing) to ease the burden of those suffering from the economic crisis caused by the Covid-19 pandemic. Furthermore, he had been accused of misusing his position as the then Deputy Minister of Youth and Sports to persuade the Malaysian National Football team to select his younger brother; Wan Kuzri for upcoming international fixtures. This abuse of power lead to many criticising him, most notably by his own father.

Personal life
In his own free time, he likes to read books and play video games.

Election Results

References 

1987 births
Living people
Malaysian people of Malay descent
Malaysian Muslims
Malaysian United Indigenous Party politicians
Ministry of Youth and Sports (Malaysia)
Government ministers of Malaysia
Alumni of King's College London
Universiti Teknologi Petronas alumni
21st-century Malaysian politicians